LeRoy Stone (January 5, 1894 – September 15, 1949) was an American film editor and a screenwriter.

He worked on over 60 films, being nominated at the 17th Academy Awards in the category of Best Film Editing for his work on the film Going My Way.

Filmography
Film
Civilization (1915)
The Toll Gate (as Le Roy Stone) (1920)
Sand! (1920)
The Testing Block (1920)
Skin Deep (1922)
Eyes of the Forest (1923)
 Flowing Gold (1924)
The Woman on the Jury (1924)
Flirting with Love (1924)
If I Marry Again (1925)
The Talker (1925)
The Lady Who Lied (1925)
Sailors' Wives (1928)
Harold Teen (1928)
The Butter and Egg Man (1928)
Show Girl (1928)
Naughty Baby (1928)
Children of the Ritz (1929)
Prisoners (1929)Twin Beds (1929)Sally (uncredited) (1929)Bride of the Regiment (1930)Sunny (edited by) (1930)The Finger Points (1931)The Lady Who Dared (1931)Penrod and Sam (edited by) (1931)Make Me a Star (uncredited) (1932)The Phantom President (uncredited) (1932)If I Had a Million (uncredited) (1932)Duck Soup (uncredited) (1933)Six of a Kind (uncredited) (1934)Belle of the Nineties (1934)College Rhythm (1934)Goin' to Town'' (1935)
The Milky Way (edited by) (1936)
Early to Bed (1936)
College Holiday (1936)
Make Way for Tomorrow (edited by) (1937)
Ebb Tide (1937)
College Swing (1938)
The Texans (1938)
Say It in French (1938)
Man About Town (1939)
Adventure in Diamonds (1940)
Buck Benny Rides Again (edited by) (1940)
I Want a Divorce (1940)
Love Thy Neighbor (1940)
Skylark (1941)
Louisiana Purchase (1941)
Are Husbands Necessary? (1942)
Wake Island (1942)
Riding High (1943)
True to Life (1943)
Going My Way (as Leroy Stone) (1944)
Murder, He Says (1945)
Hold That Blonde (1945)
Blue Skies (1946)
Variety Girl (1947)
Welcome Stranger (supervising editor) (1947)
The Big Clock (1948)
My Own True Love (1948)
Isn't It Romantic? (1948)
My Friend Irma (1949)
Chicago Deadline (1949)
Appointment with Danger (1950)

References

External links

People from San Francisco
1894 births
1949 deaths
American film editors